William Keswick (15 April 1834 – 9 March 1912) was a British Conservative politician and businessman, patriarch of the Keswick family, an influential shipping family in Hong Kong associated with Jardine Matheson Holdings.

Biography
Keswick was born in 1834 in Dumfriesshire in the Scottish Lowlands. His grandmother, Jean Jardine Johnstone, was an older sister of Dr. William Jardine, co-founder of Jardine Matheson. His father Thomas Keswick, from Dumfriesshire had married Jardine's niece and daughter of Jean, Margaret Johnstone, and entered the Jardine business. The company operated as merchant traders and had a major influence in the First and Second Opium Wars although the company stopped this trading in 1870 to pursue a broad range of trades including shipping, railways, textiles and property development.

William arrived in China and Hong Kong in 1855, the first of six generations of the Keswick family to be associated with Jardines. He established a Jardine Matheson office in Yokohama, Japan in 1859. He returned to Hong Kong to become a partner of the firm in 1862. He became managing partner or Tai-pan of the firm in 1874 until his departure in 1886. He left Hong Kong in 1886 to take control of Matheson & Co. in London responsible only to the firm's senior partner Sir Robert Jardine (1825–1905). He remained the firm's managing director until his death in 1912. Keswick also served as a director in the then British-based fur trading firm Hudson's Bay Company.

He spent three spells on the Legislative and Executive Councils of Hong Kong between 1868 and 1887. He was further listed as a director of the HongKong, Canton & Macao Steamboat Company in 1876. Whilst in the colony, William also served as Consul-general for the Kingdom of Hawaii, for which he was made a Knight Commander of the Hawaiian Order of Kalakao (named in honour of Kalākaua, the country's last king). He also acted as consul for the Kingdom of Denmark in Hong Kong.

In 1888, Keswick and the chemist Herbert W. C. Tweddle bought the Negritos oil fields on the hacienda La Brea y Pariñas in Peru. Keswick and Tweddle then formed the London and Pacific Petroleum Company to profit from the property.

After serving as High Sheriff of Surrey for 1897 he was elected Member of Parliament for Epsom at a by-election in 1899, and held the seat until his resignation on 8March 1912 by the procedural device of accepting the post of Steward of the Manor of Northstead.

William died the day after this resignation at his home, Eastwood Park, Great Bookham, Surrey, on 9March 1912 aged 77. William had lived in the house since 1882 and on his death, it passed to his son (and only surviving child) Henry.

Family
Keswick married first Amelia Sophia Dubeux (d. 1883) and had two sons:
Henry Keswick (1870–1928)
Lieutenant David Johnstone Keswick (1876–1900), an officer in the 12th Lancers who was killed in South Africa during the Second Boer War.

His grandson, William Johnston Keswick "Tony" (1903–90) was Jardine's Tai-pan between 1934 and 1941 and later Governor of the Hudson's Bay Company

References

External links 
 

1835 births
1912 deaths
Conservative Party (UK) MPs for English constituencies
UK MPs 1895–1900
UK MPs 1900–1906
UK MPs 1906–1910
UK MPs 1910
UK MPs 1910–1918
Hudson's Bay Company people
Chairmen of HSBC
William
Hong Kong chief executives
Members of the Legislative Council of Hong Kong
Members of the Executive Council of Hong Kong
Chairmen of the Shanghai Municipal Council
High Sheriffs of Surrey